Matthew Lee Andriese (born August 28, 1989) is an American professional baseball pitcher in the Los Angeles Dodgers organization. He previously played in Major League Baseball (MLB) for the Tampa Bay Rays, Arizona Diamondbacks, Los Angeles Angels, Boston Red Sox, and Seattle Mariners and for the Yomiuri Giants of Nippon Professional Baseball (NPB)..

Career

Amateur career

Andriese attended Redlands East Valley High School, where he played for the school's baseball team along with Tyler Chatwood. He was selected by the Texas Rangers in the 37th round of the 2008 MLB draft, but did not sign with Texas. He enrolled at the University of California, Riverside, to play college baseball for the UC Riverside Highlanders baseball team. In 2010, he played collegiate summer baseball with the Cotuit Kettleers of the Cape Cod Baseball League.

San Diego Padres

The San Diego Padres selected Andriese in the third round of the 2011 MLB draft. He signed with the Padres, and pitched for the Lake Elsinore Storm of the Class A-Advanced California League in 2012. He had a strong performance with the San Antonio Missions of the Double-A Texas League in 2013, and was promoted to the Tucson Padres of the Triple-A Pacific Coast League during the season.

Tampa Bay Rays
On January 22, 2014, the Padres traded Andriese, Logan Forsythe, Brad Boxberger, Matt Lollis, and Maxx Tissenbaum to the Tampa Bay Rays in exchange for Alex Torres and Jesse Hahn. Andriese pitched for the Durham Bulls of the Triple-A International League during the 2014 season.

Andriese made the Rays' Opening Day roster out of spring training in 2015. He made his major league debut on April 10, and made his first start on April 14. He finished the 2015 season with 25 appearances (eight starts) and a 4.11 earned run average (ERA). In 2016, Andriese again spent time in both the rotation and the bullpen, appearing in 29 games (19 starts); he went 8–8 with a 4.37 ERA.

At the start of the 2017 season, Andriese was the fifth pitcher in the Rays rotation, he started the season going 5–1 with a 3.54 ERA in 12 starts before falling victim to a stress reaction in his hip in mid-June. He was moved to the 60-day disabled list, and did not return until late August. Overall for the 2017 season, he made 18 appearances (17 starts) with a 5–5 record and 4.50 ERA. Andriese began the 2018 season with Tampa Bay, pitching to a 3–4 record and 4.07 ERA in 27 games (four starts).

Arizona Diamondbacks
On July 25, 2018, the Rays traded Andriese to the Arizona Diamondbacks in exchange for minor-league catcher Michael Pérez and minor-league pitcher Brian Shaffer. Through the end of the 2018 season, Andriese made 14 appearances (one start) with the Diamondbacks, going 0–3 with an ERA of 9.00. He returned to Arizona for the 2019 season, making 54 appearances (all in relief) while accruing a 4.71 ERA and a 5–5 record.

Los Angeles Angels
On January 14, 2020, Andriese was traded to the Los Angeles Angels in exchange for Jeremy Beasley. On July 26, 2020, Andriese made his Angels debut against the Oakland Athletics, in relief of Shohei Ohtani—he pitched  innings, striking out five batters and allowing no runs. Overall during the 2020 season, Andriese appeared in 16 games (1 start) with the Angels, compiling a 2–4 record with a 4.50 ERA and two saves. On December 2, Andriese was nontendered by the Angels.

Boston Red Sox
On December 23, 2020, Andriese signed a one-year, $1.85 million deal with the Boston Red Sox. In 26 appearances for Boston, Andriese struggled to a 6.03 ERA with 38 strikeouts; he was designated for assignment on August 17, 2021. On August 19, Andriese was released by the Red Sox.

Seattle Mariners
On August 22, 2021, Andriese signed a major-league contract with the Seattle Mariners. Andriese made 8 appearances for the Mariners, recording a 2.45 ERA with 12 strikeouts. After being designated for assignment on September 28, Andriese elected free agency on September 30.

Yomiuri Giants
On December 17, 2021, Andreise signed with the Yomiuri Giants of Nippon Professional Baseball.

Los Angeles Dodgers
On February 1, 2023, Andreise signed a minor league contract with the Los Angeles Dodgers.

International career
On October 29, 2018, Andriese was selected to the MLB All-Stars for the 2018 MLB Japan All-Star Series.

Personal life
Andriese and his wife, Jill, have two sons.

References

External links

1989 births
Living people
People from Redlands, California
UC Riverside Highlanders baseball players
Cotuit Kettleers players
Major League Baseball pitchers
Tampa Bay Rays players
Arizona Diamondbacks players
Los Angeles Angels players
Boston Red Sox players
Seattle Mariners players
Baseball players from California
Arizona League Diamondbacks players
Charlotte Stone Crabs players
Durham Bulls players
Eugene Emeralds players
Lake Elsinore Storm players
San Antonio Missions players
Tucson Padres players
Visalia Rawhide players
Worcester Red Sox players
Yomiuri Giants players